Anna Trevisi (born 8 May 1992) is an Italian professional racing cyclist, who currently rides for UCI Women's WorldTeam . She won the junior road race at the 2010 European Road Championships.

Major results

2013
 8th Erondegemse Pijl
2014
 8th Tour of Chongming Island World Cup
2015
 10th Sparkassen Giro
2016
 3rd Gran Prix San Luis Femenino
 6th Women's Tour de Yorkshire
 10th Gran Premio della Liberazione#List of women's race winners
2017
 8th Grand Prix de Dottignies
2019
 5th EPZ Omloop van Borsele
 5th Vuelta a la Comunitat Valenciana Feminas
 6th Trofee Maarten Wynants
2021
 5th Ronde de Mouscron
2022
 6th Ronde de Mouscron 
 9th Scheldeprijs

See also
 List of 2015 UCI Women's Teams and riders

References

External links
 

1992 births
Living people
Italian female cyclists
Sportspeople from the Province of Reggio Emilia
Cyclists from Emilia-Romagna